Upper Macedonia (Greek: Ἄνω Μακεδονία, Ánō Makedonía) is a geographical and tribal term to describe the upper/western of the two parts in which, together with Lower Macedonia, the ancient  kingdom of Macedon was roughly divided. Upper Macedonia had been dominated by the Illyrians for centuries. It became part of the kingdom of Macedon in the mid-4th century BC. From that date, its inhabitants were politically equal to Lower Macedonians. Upper Macedonia was divided in the regions of Elimeia, Eordaea, Orestis, Lynkestis, Pelagonia, Deuriopus, Tymphaea, and later incorporated Atintania and eastern Dassaretis until Roman intervention. The middle and southern parts of Upper Macedonia corresponds roughly to the modern Greek region of West Macedonia while the northern part of Upper Macedonia corresponds to the southwestern corner of the Republic of North Macedonia.

Three of the most important Hellenistic dynasties originated from Upper Macedonia: the Lagids from Eordaea, the Seleucids from Orestis and the Antigonids from Elimiotis.

See also
History of Macedonia (ancient kingdom)
Lower Macedonia
Ancient Greek geography
List of ancient Macedonians in epigraphy

References

Sources
Dictionary of Greek and Roman Geography  by William Smith, Mahmoud Saba
JSTOR:Philip II and Upper Macedonia  A. B. Bosworth
Relations between Upper and Lower Macedonia https://web.archive.org/web/20080119020638/http://www.history-of-macedonia.com/wordpress/
JSTOR: Epigraphes Ano Makedonias -Epigraphical Database
Dimitrios C. Samsaris, Historical Geography of the Roman province of Macedonia  (The Department of Western Macedonia today) (in Greek), Thessaloniki 1989 (Society for Macedonian Studies). .

External links
Map of the growth of Macedonia 4th BC - Upper Macedonia is shown in light-brown - Retrieved from Eliznik. com.

 
Geography of ancient Macedonia
Macedonia
Macedonia (ancient kingdom)